Helianthemum gorgoneum is a species of flowering plants of the family Cistaceae. The species is endemic to Cape Verde. It is listed as an endangered plant by the IUCN.

The species is found in the west of Cape Verde, in the islands of Santo Antão, Santa Luzia, Fogo and Brava. The plant is found from sea level up to  elevation. It is a mesophyte that grows in sub-humid and semi-arid areas. It grows on rocky and volcanic soils.

References

Cistaceae
Endemic flora of Cape Verde
Flora of Brava, Cape Verde
Flora of Fogo, Cape Verde
Flora of Santo Antão, Cape Verde
Santa Luzia, Cape Verde